Saint Congar (also Cumgar or Cungar; ; Latin: Concarius) ( – 27 November 520), was a Welsh abbot and supposed bishop in Somerset, then in the British kingdom of Somerset, now in England.

Congar grew up in Pembrokeshire and travelled across the Bristol Channel to found a monastery on Cadbury Hill at Congresbury in Somerset. He gave his name to this village and to the parish church at Badgworth. This supposedly became the centre of a bishopric which preceded the Diocese of Bath and Wells. Legend has it that his staff took root when he thrust it into the ground and the resulting yew tree can be seen to this day. He later returned to Wales, but died on a pilgrimage to Jerusalem.

The parish of Congresbury claimed to have enshrined Congar's body during the Middle Ages, and mentioned it in several pilgrim guides.  There appear to have been no rival claimants for his relics.  Congresbury itself is first mentioned in Asser's Life of Alfred as a derelict Celtic monastery, probably related to Congar.  Though a minor saint, he is mentioned in a litany of Winchester in about 1060, and his feast day was recorded in most medieval Somerset calendars.

Churches dedicated to Congar may also be found in Brittany and Cornwall, where he is said to have been a hermit at St Ingunger, in the parish of Lanivet.

References

External links
 

470 births
520 deaths
Bishops of Bath and Wells
Medieval Cornish saints
People from Pembrokeshire
People from North Somerset (district)
Southwestern Brythonic saints
Welsh abbots
6th-century Christian saints
6th-century English bishops
Welsh hermits
English hermits